Alexandra Estella Meneses (born February 12, 1965) is an American actress and model.

Early life
Meneses was born in Chicago, Illinois. She is of Mexican descent on her father's side and Ukrainian descent on her mother's side. Meneses studied acting at Chicago's The Second City Improvisational Theater during summer vacations. Immediately upon graduation from high school, she received a modeling contract in Milan, Italy. Originally, her stay in Italy was only to be three months, but she fell in love with the country, and remained there for two years, becoming a successful model. When Meneses returned to the United States, she moved to Los Angeles, where she studied acting at the Lee Strasberg Institute.

Career
Meneses was a regular cast member in the Showtime comedy series Sherman Oaks in 1995. She later had the recurring role as Teresa Morales in the final season of the CBS western drama series Dr. Quinn, Medicine Woman, replacing actress Michelle Bonilla from the previous season. She also had supporting roles in a number of films, including Selena, The Flintstones in Viva Rock Vegas and Auto Focus.

She had other roles on television, appearing in an episode of Friends as Cookie (Joey Tribbiani's sister), as well as episodes of Suddenly Susan, The Hughleys, Any Day Now, CSI: Crime Scene Investigation, NCIS, Psych, and The Goldbergs. Meneses has also appeared in numerous Los Angeles stage productions. She had a recurring role in the CBS comedy series, Everybody Loves Raymond as Robert Barone's Italian girlfriend, Stefania. In 2015, Meneses was cast as aging telenovela star Isabela Santamaria in the NBC comedy series, Telenovela. On February 19, 2021, Meneses was cast in a recurring role for The CW series Walker.

Filmography

Film

Television

References

External links

1965 births
Living people
20th-century American actresses
21st-century American actresses
Actresses from Chicago
American film actresses
American actresses of Mexican descent
American people of Ukrainian descent
American television actresses